On March 31, 1982, Yaacov Bar-Simantov, who was the second secretary of Israel's embassy in France, was shot dead in Paris by an unknown female assailant.

Barsimantov was responsible for liaison with the French National Assembly and Senate and other political organizations.

At 12:50 P.M, a young woman wearing a white beret approached the diplomat, who was accompanied by his wife and 8-year-old daughter, and shot him in the head three times with a 7.65 millimeter semiautomatic pistol in the lobby of their apartment building at 17 Avenue Ferdinand Buisson in the affluent 16th district near the Bois de Boulogne. His 17-year-old son, who heard the shots but did not witness the murder, chased the woman, who was able to flee into the Paris Metro. The diplomat was announced dead about two hours after the shooting. The Israeli Embassy stated that no particular security arrangements had been in effect for the diplomat, who had been residing in Paris for a little over two years on his first foreign assignment. The shooting came three days after his office had been sprayed with machine-gun fire.

Responsibility for the murder was claimed by a group called the  Lebanese Armed Revolutionary Factions. Israel accused the PLO of being involved and considered the murder a violation of the terms of the July 1981 ceasefire arranged by the United States after fighting in Lebanon. The PLO insisted that the cease-fire covered only actions taking place in Lebanon.

George Abdallah, a Lebanese national involved in Bar-Simantov's murder, as well as that of an American military officer in the 1980s, was to be released by French judiciary authorities in 2013. A parole board had agreed to release Abdallah, 61, on condition that he would be expelled from France immediately. The French government did not follow on, preventing the parole.

At the end of 2021, still not released, he is in Lannemezan jail.

References 

Assassinated Israeli diplomats
Israeli people murdered abroad
People of the Mossad
1982 in Paris
People murdered in Paris
1982 murders in France
1980s murders in Paris